Bechler Falls ht.  is a waterfall on the Bechler River in Yellowstone National Park. The falls were named in 1921 by explorers E. C. Gregg and C.H. Birdseye.

See also
 Waterfalls in Yellowstone National Park

Notes

Waterfalls of Wyoming
Waterfalls of Yellowstone National Park
Waterfalls of Teton County, Wyoming